Anthurium gracile, the red pearls anthurium, is a species of flowering plant in the family Araceae, native to the American tropics. An epiphyte, when kept as a houseplant it needs excellent drainage.

References

gracile
House plants
Flora of Central America
Flora of northern South America
Flora of western South America
Flora of Brazil
Plants described in 1834